Tannay railway station is a railway station in the municipality of Tannay, in the Swiss canton of Vaud. It is an intermediate stop on the standard gauge Lausanne–Geneva line of Swiss Federal Railways.

Services 
The following services stop at Tannay:

References

External links 
 
 

Railway stations in the canton of Vaud
Swiss Federal Railways stations